Taveuni F.C. is a Fijian football team playing in the second division of the Fiji Football Association competitions. It is based on the island of  Taveuni.

Their uniform includes gold and black shirt.

History 
The Taveuni Soccer Association was formed in 1947, under the presidency of A. Dayaram.

Current squad
Squad for the 2018 Inter-District Championship

See also 
 Fiji Football Association

References

Bibliography 
 M. Prasad, Sixty Years of Soccer in Fiji 1938–1998: The Official History of the Fiji Football Association, Fiji Football Association, Suva, 1998.

Football clubs in Fiji
1947 establishments in Fiji
Taveuni